Chen Jing (born 3 September 1975) is a Chinese volleyball player who played for the China women's national volleyball team.

She competed in the 2000 Summer Olympics and in the 2004 Summer Olympics, and the 2004 FIVB World Grand Prix.

References

1975 births
Living people
Chinese women's volleyball players
Olympic volleyball players of China
Volleyball players at the 2000 Summer Olympics
Volleyball players at the 2004 Summer Olympics
Olympic gold medalists for China
Olympic medalists in volleyball
Sportspeople from Chengdu
Medalists at the 2004 Summer Olympics
Asian Games medalists in volleyball
Volleyball players at the 2002 Asian Games
Asian Games gold medalists for China
Volleyball players from Sichuan
Medalists at the 2002 Asian Games
Middle blockers
21st-century Chinese women